WSGG (89.3 FM, "Radio Avivamiento") is a radio station licensed to serve Norfolk, Connecticut.  The station is owned by Revival Christian Ministries, Inc.  It airs a Spanish language Contemporary Christian music format.

The station was assigned the callsign WSGG by the Federal Communications Commission on May 17, 2001.

Translators

References

External links
 WSGG official website

Contemporary Christian radio stations in the United States
SGG
Norfolk, Connecticut
Radio stations established in 2001
2001 establishments in Connecticut
SGG